The 2022 Commonwealth Games, officially known as the XXII Commonwealth Games and commonly known as Birmingham 2022, was an international multi-sport event for members of the Commonwealth of Nations that took place in Birmingham, England between 28 July and 8 August 2022.

Birmingham was announced as host on 21 December 2017. The Games marked England's third time hosting the Commonwealth Games after London 1934 and Manchester 2002, and the 7th Games held in the United Kingdom, with previous events in Wales and Scotland: Cardiff 1958, Edinburgh 1970 and 1986 and Glasgow 2014.

The Games was the largest ever held, with 72 participating nations and over 1.3 million ticket sales. It was also the first to have more events for women than men and the first integrated event, with the para competition held at the same time. Alongside the Games, a cultural festival was held across the West Midlands, as well as a number of trade events. An esports event was also held.

It marked the last time that the Games were held under Queen Elizabeth II prior to her death on 8 September of that year, which was exactly one month after the conclusion of the Games.

Host selection

Two cities initially launched bids for the games; Durban, South Africa, and Edmonton, Canada. Edmonton withdrew its bid in February 2015, leaving Durban as the only bid to go forward to CGF General Assembly in September 2015. Durban initially secured the right to host the games, as they were the sole bidder for the event. The city previously considered bidding for the 2020 or 2024 Summer Olympics, but later dropped the idea as it wanted to focus on the 2022 Commonwealth Games. It would have marked the first time the games were held in Africa and the second time a Commonwealth republic would have hosted, following Delhi, India, in 2010. The games were set to open on 18 July 2022, coinciding with the birthday of the late South African president, Nelson Mandela. It was reported in February 2017 that Durban might be unable to host the games due to financial constraints. This was confirmed one month later on 13 March 2017 when the CGF stripped Durban of their rights to host the Games.

The bidding process for the 2022 Commonwealth Games was relaunched in March 2017 where English cities Birmingham and Liverpool expressed their interests in hosting the Games. On 14 March 2017, Manchester also expressed an interest in hosting the Games.

By April 2017, the British Government asked city councils to submit proposals for hosting the 2022 Games. Only Birmingham and Liverpool submitted official applications to the Department for Digital, Culture, Media and Sport. London declined to bid, as it was focusing its efforts on preparing for the World Athletics and Para Athletics Championships. On 27 April 2017, Manchester City Council announced that Manchester would not bid for the Games but could co-host the Games with other English cities. In early September 2017, Birmingham was selected over Liverpool for the recommended bid for England.

The CGF announced that the deadline for the submission of bids was 30 September 2017 and its executive board was expected to announce the host by the end of 2017. Commonwealth Games England submitted the Birmingham bid before the deadline to the CGF to host the 2022 Games. However, it was announced that the bid was not fully compliant, and the bidding process was extended until 30 November 2017. The CGF had 170 questions regarding Birmingham's bid. On 21 December 2017, Birmingham was awarded for the 2022 Games as Durban's replacement host. Louise Martin, president of the CGF, made the official announcement at a press conference at the Arena Academy in Birmingham.

Development and preparation 
The Birmingham Organising Committee for the 2022 Commonwealth Games (BOCCG) is responsible for the planning and operational delivery of the Games. This includes sport, venue and competition management, ticket sales, all ceremonies and the Queen's Baton Relay. The headquarters of the organising committee is located in One Brindleyplace building and has taken up the office until December 2022.

In March 2018, the BOCCG paid £25 million ($35 million) fee to the CGF for the right to host the 2022 Commonwealth Games. The fee included the £20 million ($28 million) for the Games hosting charges and £5 million ($7 million) for the development work in the Commonwealth.

In July 2018, British Prime Minister Theresa May appointed John Crabtree as Chair of the BOCCG. In January 2019, Ian Reid was announced as chief executive officer of the BOCCG. On 6 June 2019, the British Government introduced the Commonwealth Games bill which ensured the prohibition of unauthorised sales of Games tickets, effective flow of transport around Games venues, complete protection of commercial rights, and compliance with financial propriety rules by the government's funding of the BOCCG. The bill received royal assent and was passed into law as the Birmingham Commonwealth Games Act 2020 on 25 June 2020.

In June 2020, it was announced that the entire schedule of the Games would be offset by one day to reduce conflicts with sporting events rescheduled due to the COVID-19 pandemic, particularly the UEFA Euro 2020 (held on 11 June to 11 July 2021), the 2020 Summer Olympics (held on 23 July to 8 August 2021), the UEFA Women's Euro 2022 (held 6 to 31 July in England; the opening ceremony time would have conflicted with one of the semifinal matches), and the final days of the 2022 World Athletics Championships (held from 15 to 24 July). All athletes and officials are required to test negative for COVID-19 on a PCR test before departure and upon arrival; infections during the Games will be handled on a case-by-case basis, with athletes not necessarily required to withdraw or publicly disclose their infection. Commonwealth Games Australia considered the protocols to be less stringent and more "relaxed" than expected, and stated that it planned to impose stricter biosecurity protocols on its athletes to ensure their safety.

Athletes' village 
On 11 August 2020, the BOCCG announced that the athletes and team officials will be housed in three ‘campus’ villages close to competition venues at the University of Birmingham, the University of Warwick, and the NEC Hotel Campus. Around 1,600 athletes and officials are set to be accommodated at the NEC Hotel Campus, 1,900 at the University of Warwick, and the principal village with 2,800 at the University of Birmingham.

Transport 

The A34 flyover in Perry Barr has been demolished in favour of a dual carriageway at ground level, cycle path and improved public transport services which were approved by Birmingham City Council in October 2019 under its £27.1 million scheme.

The city council announced in January 2020 that the existing National Express Bus Depot in Perry Barr will be demolished as the depot site would be used to construct the phase two of the athletes’ village. A replacement depot will be constructed on a largely council-owned land on nearby Aston Lane, at a cost of £16 million, eight times the original estimate.

The University railway station, which serves the University of Birmingham, will be renovated and is expected to be complete in time for the Games. The University of Birmingham is due to host hockey and squash events for the Games. The Birmingham-based architectural firm Associated Architects designed the masterplan of the station's renovation. Its proposals for the stop, on the suburban Cross City Line heading south-west out of the city, include a new pedestrian bridge over the Worcester and Birmingham Canal. The practice said the new station would be built adjacent to the existing station that serves the university and would be able to accommodate approximately seven million passengers a year – double the current station's footfall. The renovation of the station will cost around £22 million. In July 2020, it was announced that the cost of the renovation was increased to £56 million, out of which £12 million will be funded by the British Government. In addition the new station was not finished in time for the games.

Transport for West Midlands (TfWM) will provide the city's first continuous cross-city bus route in time for the Games. The new Sprint bus route will run an express service along the A34 and A45 between Walsall and Birmingham Airport and Solihull to Walsall via the city centre. The service will be zero-emission with priority signals and extended bus lanes, along with "a swift boarding experience" to improve journey times and reliability. In February 2020 it was announced that the West Midlands Combined Authority Board was planning to approve the £88 million funding and delivery schedule for Sprint in advance of the Games, to offer commuters and the Games visitors services to key venues including Alexander Stadium, Arena Birmingham and the Resorts World Arena.

Cost and financing 

At the time of submission of the bid to the CGF, the bid committee announced that the event would cost £750 million. On 25 June 2019, the British Government announced that the event will cost £778 million. The British Government will cover the 75% (£594 million) and Birmingham City Council will cover the rest 25% (£184 million). The budget is lower than the £967 million spent on the Gold Coast 2018, but higher than the £543 million spent on the Glasgow 2014. It is set to be the most expensive sporting event in the UK since the 2012 Summer Olympics in London which cost £8.8 billion. The real cost will be published after completion.

Ticketing 
Over 1.3 million tickets were sold for the Games. A ticket ballot for local residents opened on 14 July 2021, with the main public ticket ballot running from 8 to 30 September 2021.

Security 
The West Midlands Police said around 3,000 officers would be deployed to patrol the 2022 Commonwealth Games. 1,000 of these were to come from West Midlands Police and 2000 from a "mutual aid" arrangement with other UK forces. Additionally, private drones were banned over a no-fly zone and 55 police dogs were also part of the security plan.

Queen's baton relay 

The Queen's baton of the 2022 Commonwealth Games was unveiled 29 September 2021. Designed as a collaboration between Birmingham Open Media, Raymont-Osman Product Design, Maokwo and Kajul, it is constructed using lost-wax casting, 3D Printing, copper plating and CNC machining. It incorporates  copper, aluminum, and brass metals symbolising medals, and a strip of platinum in observance of the Queen's Platinum Jubilee. It also contains a 360-degree camera, an LED lighting system tied to a heart rate monitor (and displaying different effects when held by two people), and sensors to record environmental conditions—whose data will be analysed by a team at the University of Birmingham following the relay.

Laura Nyahuye, who lead the team of five artists at Maokwo, stated that the baton was designed to "relate" to the countries and residents of the Commonwealth, and reflect the "authenticity and honesty" of its journey; these goals were met by avoiding the use of precious metals, and through its use of copper—which is designed to oxidise and develop a teal patina over the course of the relay.

The relay began on 7 October 2021 at Buckingham Palace in London, and will last for 294 days—travelling through 72 Commonwealth nations and territories. After placing her message inside the baton, Queen Elizabeth II presented it to British Paralympic athlete and cyclist Kadeena Cox. During the opening ceremony, the baton was delivered to Charles, Prince of Wales, who read the Queen's message to officially open the Games.

Venues 

Birmingham 2022 took place in 15 venues spread across the West Midlands region, with seven of them, including the athletics stadium and marathon route, located in the city of Birmingham. The National Exhibition Centre complex, located on the fringes of the city in neighbouring Solihull, hosted events in its exhibition halls and at the Resorts World Arena. The six other regional hosts were Coventry, Cannock Chase, Royal Leamington Spa, Sandwell, Warwick and Wolverhampton. A sixteenth venue, the Lee Valley VeloPark in Stratford, East London, hosted the track cycling.

The following venues were used for the Games:

Birmingham
Alexander Stadium (renovated) – Opening Ceremony, Closing Ceremony, Athletics
Utilita Arena Birmingham (existing) – Gymnastics
Edgbaston Cricket Ground (existing) – Cricket
Smithfield Market (purpose-built temporary stadia) – 3x3 Basketball, 3x3 Wheelchair Basketball, Beach Volleyball
Sutton Park (existing) – Triathlon
University of Birmingham Squash Centre (existing) – Hockey, Squash
Victoria Square (existing) – Marathon (finish)
 West Midlands Region
Cannock Chase, Staffordshire (existing) – Cycling (Mountain Bike)
Coventry Arena (existing) – Rugby Sevens, Judo, Wrestling
Victoria Park Bowling Greens, Leamington Spa (existing) – Lawn Bowls
Sandwell Aquatics Centre (purpose-built) – Aquatics
National Exhibition Centre, Solihull (existing)
Hall 1 – Weightlifting, Para Powerlifting
Hall 3 – Table Tennis, Para Table Tennis 
Hall 4 – Boxing
Hall 5 – Badminton
Resorts World Arena – Netball
Myton Fields (existing) – Cycling (Road Race)
West Park, Wolverhampton (existing) – Cycling (Time Trials)
 London
Lee Valley VeloPark, London (existing) – Cycling (Track)

Ceremonies

Opening ceremony 

The opening ceremonies of the 2022 Commonwealth Games were held at Alexander Stadium on 28 July 2022. Director Iqbal Khan stated that the ceremony would aim to showcase the "vivid and vibrant confidence" of Birmingham. It was headlined by Birmingham-based new wave band Duran Duran, while Tony Iommi of Black Sabbath–who is also a Birmingham native–performed alongside Soweto Kinch during a segment of the ceremony.

Closing ceremony 
The closing ceremony took place on 8 August 2022 at Alexander Stadium, and included the formal handover to the Australian state of Victoria, host of the 2026 Commonwealth Games in a segment headlined by Vanessa Amorosi. The ceremony featured tributes to the industrial history of Birmingham, the Windrush generation and Birmingham TV show Peaky Blinders, and included performances from a number of famous West Midlands musicians and groups, including Dexys Midnight Runners, UB40, Panjabi MC, Musical Youth, Goldie, Beverley Knight, Apache Indian, Jorja Smith, The Selecter, and Laura Mvula. The grand finale featured a surprise appearance by Ozzy Osbourne in his first live performance in three years, joined by Tony Iommi and former touring members of Black Sabbath Tommy Clufetos and Adam Wakeman for a medley of "Iron Man" and "Paranoid".

Participating associations 
All 72 Commonwealth Games Associations sent athletes to the 2022 Commonwealth Games.

The number of athletes from each association is:

Sports

Commonwealth Games Charter
A new edition of the Commonwealth Games Charter came into effect for these Games. In addition to the ten core sports that were part of Gold Coast 2018 — athletics, badminton, boxing, hockey, lawn bowls, netball (for women), rugby sevens, squash, swimming and weightlifting — five new sports will be integrated into the core sports: road cycling, judo (previously optional), triathlon, table tennis, and wrestling. The charter also mandates that a number of parasports events (i.e. sports for elite athletes with disabilities) must be integrated within four core sports: athletics, lawn bowls, swimming and weightlifting (the lattermost is actually represented by a variation of powerlifting).

The charter also establishes the list of optional sports and disciplines that can be chosen by the organisation of each edition: archery (recurve), basketball (3x3 or 5x5), beach volleyball, cycling (mountain bike and track), rhythmic gymnastics, and shooting (clay target, full bore, small bore and pistol). This same rule also establishes that the following events for athletes with disabilities are optional: wheelchair basketball (3x3), para track-cycling, para-table tennis and para-triathlon. Including compulsory and optional sports (disciplines), there shall be no more than 4 team sports on the programme of a Commonwealth Games. If basketball (3x3) is selected from the pool of optional sports, basketball (wheelchair para 3x3) becomes an obligatory event (or vice versa), in which case the sport of basketball shall be considered as one team sport. In cases when cricket is selected from the pool of optional sports, wheelchair basketball also becomes a part of the programme and can be an exception to the 4 team sports limit. Respecting local demands, an extra sport or some extra events can be included in this list, but they have to be approved by the Commonwealth Games Federation two years before that edition is held. The current rules also determine gender parity, whereby men and women have an equal (or broadly equal) share of events.

Input to list of disciplines 
On 22 December 2017, the BBC reported that the organisers of the games were in talks with the International Cricket Council (ICC) about the inclusion of women's cricket. In November 2018, the ICC confirmed that they have submitted a bid to include women's cricket in the Games. The bid was made in partnership with the England and Wales Cricket Board (ECB).

It was also reported that shooting was likely to be excluded from the games citing a lack of facilities around Birmingham. Shooting has been included at every Commonwealth Games since Christchurch 1974. In January 2018, the dropping of shooting from the games programme was confirmed by the then CEO of the CGF David Grevemberg. In December 2018, The International Shooting Sport Federation (ISSF) delegation including President of ISSF Vladimir Lisin and CEO of British Shooting (BS) Hamish McInnes visited Birmingham and discussed with the Birmingham organising committee to add shooting in the 2022 Commonwealth Games.

In December 2018, the World Archery Federation (WA) confirmed that they had delivered a proposal for archery's inclusion in the Games. The bid was made in partnership with Archery GB and included Aston Hall as a suggested competition venue.

In June 2019, after some time of popular searches and queries. Birmingham organising committee recommended the addition of two extra sports: para table tennis and beach volleyball. The proposal was approved by the CGF executive board.

The CGF officially announced on 13 August 2019 that the women's T20 cricket, beach volleyball and para table tennis have been included in the Games while due to infrastructure and logistics issues shooting had to be excluded and the proposal to add archery was rejected.

Birmingham 2022 list of disciplines 
With the changes in the Charter, and the review of options, the major changes from Gold Coast 2018 include the addition of judo to the core sports and the local organizers' optional decision to hold a women's cricket tournament, taking advantage of local infrastructure. Returning to the Games for the first time in 24 years, due to various calendar issues, cricket will be exclusively female for the first time.

First time events introduced at Birmingham 2022 are 3x3 basketball and its wheelchair counterpart. Birmingham will have the largest number of events available for women and athletes with disabilities in the history of the Games.

In October 2020, the list of events to be played in Birmingham was revealed, though three parasport relays in athletics and swimming were later removed from the programme owing to a lack of indicative entries. The schedule was refined to 280 finals played across 20 disciplines. This includes 136 events for women and 134 for men, an unprecedented gender balance amongst major multi-sport events though falling short of the 2018 Commonwealth Games when a perfect gender split had been achieved. In addition, 10 mixed gender events and 39 parasport events were scheduled.

The final list of disciplines, with the number of events in each discipline noted in the brackets, is:

 Aquatics

Associated competitions 
In January 2020, the Indian Olympic Association (IOA), which functions also as the Commonwealth Games Association (CGA) representing India, submitted a proposal to the CGF to host a combined archery and shooting championships in Chandigarh during January 2022. The proposal was endorsed by the National Rifle Association of India (NRAI), the Government of India, the ISSF and WA. The CGF Executive Board approved the proposal at their meeting in London which took place on 21–23 February 2020, and also confirmed that the 2022 Commonwealth Shooting and Archery Championships and the 2022 Commonwealth Games will be two separately organised and funded Commonwealth Sport events. The CGF shall issue a medal table one week following the Birmingham 2022 closing ceremony that includes results from Chandigarh 2022 as a further and final ranking of competing nations and territories from the respective competitions. In July 2021, the CGF announced that the event had been cancelled due to the COVID-19 pandemic in India.

In February 2022, the CGF announced that esports would be included in the Games as a demonstration event and is in a possibility to be added at the games program at the future editions. The inaugural Commonwealth Esports Championship will have separate branding, medals, and organisation and will include both men and women's Dota 2, eFootball, and Rocket League events.

Calendar

Medal table

Podium sweeps 
The podium sweeps, in which a single CGA won all the available medals in an event, were:

Marketing

Emblem
The official emblem was unveiled on 27 July 2019 at Centenary Square during the Commonwealth Social festival. It was designed by local agency RBL, based in Royal Leamington Spa, and is a jagged, triangular "B" shape formed by blue-yellow gradient lines representing the key venues of the Games in the West Midlands. The emblem is also the first to use the new branding for the CGF, as "Commonwealth Sport". It received a mainly positive reaction from locals in the city and on social media and some compared it to the emblem for the 2012 Summer Olympics and Paralympics.

Sponsors 
The official partners of the 2022 Commonwealth Games were Longines, University of Birmingham, E.ON, Chase, Severn Trent and Dettol.

Mascot 

The official mascot for the Birmingham 2022 Commonwealth Games is Perry, a multi-coloured bull. Perry is named after an area of Birmingham, Perry Barr, within which Perry Park and the main athletics stadium, the Alexander Stadium, are located. The bull has a long history with being a symbol of Birmingham, and was positively received by the public on launch. Perry was designed by ten-year-old Emma Lou from Bolton.

Concerns and controversies

Broadcasting rights 
In November 2019, Sky New Zealand acquired the rights to broadcast the 2022 and 2026 Games in New Zealand and the Pacific Islands. In July 2020, production company Sunset+Vine was appointed as the host broadcaster for the event. In October 2020, BBC acquired the United Kingdom rights. In October 2021, Seven Network acquired the Australian rights. In June 2022, it was announced that Mediacorp has acquired the rights to broadcast the games in Singapore.

See also 
Commonwealth Youth Games held in the United Kingdom
 2000 Commonwealth Youth Games – Edinburgh (Scotland)
Commonwealth Games held in the United Kingdom
1934 British Empire Games – London (England)
1958 British Empire and Commonwealth Games – Cardiff (Wales)
1970 British Commonwealth Games – Edinburgh (Scotland)
1986 Commonwealth Games – Edinburgh (Scotland)
2002 Commonwealth Games – Manchester (England)
2014 Commonwealth Games – Glasgow (Scotland)

References

External links

 
Official results system
"Birmingham 2022". Thecgf.com. Commonwealth Games Federation

2022 Commonwealth Games
Commonwealth Games by year
Commonwealth Games
Commonwealth Games in the United Kingdom
Sport in Birmingham, West Midlands
Commonwealth Games
Commonwealth Games
2020s in Birmingham, West Midlands
Commonwealth Games
Common